Bongardia is a very small genus of plants belonging to the family Berberidaceae, and first described in 1831. There are only two known species, Bongardia chrysogonum C.A.Mey., native to North Africa, Greece, and the Middle East and B. margalla  R.R.Stewart ex Qureshi & Chaudhri, native to Pakistan.
The genus was monotypic until 1996, when the Pakistani populations were recognised by Govaerts as belonging to a second, distinct species.

The species are tuberous, herbaceous plants with a large rounded tuber and attractive pinnate leaves. The flowers are hermaphrodite (have both male and female organs). These rare and striking plants are native to rocky, mountain slopes and cultivated fields where summers are dry and winters are spent under snow. The genus was named in honour of Gustav Heinrich von Bongard (1786–1839), a German botanist, professor at St. Petersburg Imperial University. Leaves and root are edible.

Cultivation
The plants grow well in sandy well-drained soil in full sun. A porous soil and year-round protection from excessive moisture with a period of hot summer drought are required for them to thrive. They are propagated from seed.

References

Botanica Sistematica

Garden plants
Berberidaceae
Monotypic Ranunculales genera
Flora of Asia
Berberidaceae genera